Adrian Tekliński (born 3 November 1989) is a Polish road and track cyclist. He competed at every UCI Track Cycling World Championships between 2010 and 2019, except for 2014; he won the gold medal in the scratch in 2017. He won the bronze medal in the scratch at the 2015 UEC European Track Championships in Grenchen, Switzerland.

Major results

2006
 3rd  Team sprint, UEC European Junior Track Championships
2009
 3rd  Team sprint, UEC European Under-23 Track Championships
2010
 3rd  Team sprint, UEC European Under-23 Track Championships
2014
 10th Memoriał Andrzeja Trochanowskiego
2015
 3rd  Scratch, UEC European Track Championships
 9th Memoriał Romana Siemińskiego
 10th Memoriał Andrzeja Trochanowskiego
2016
 2nd  Scratch, UEC European Track Championships
 2nd Memoriał Andrzeja Trochanowskiego
 5th Visegrad 4 Bicycle Race – GP Slovakia
2017
 1st  Scratch, UCI Track Cycling World Championships
2018
 8th Memoriał Andrzeja Trochanowskiego

References

External links

1989 births
Polish male cyclists
Living people
People from Brzeg
UCI Track Cycling World Champions (men)
Polish track cyclists